Stephen Joseph Furniss (8 May 1875 – 2 September 1952) was a Liberal party member of the House of Commons of Canada. He was born in Mara Township, Ontario and became a farmer by career.

Furniss's ancestors were originators of the Furniss Steamship Lines. He attended school in Mara Township then at Ontario Business College.

He was first elected to Parliament at the Muskoka—Ontario riding in the 1935 general election then re-elected in 1940. Furniss did not seek re-election in the 1945 election after completing his second term, the 19th Canadian Parliament.

References

External links
 

1875 births
1952 deaths
Canadian farmers
Liberal Party of Canada MPs
Members of the House of Commons of Canada from Ontario